Air Marshal Ravinder Nath Bhardwaj PVSM MVC VM is a retired officer  of the Indian Air Force and a recipient of the Param Vishisht Seva Medal, Maha Vir Chakra (India's second highest gallantry Award) and the Vayu Sena Medal.

Early life
Air Marshal Ravinder Nath Bhardwaj was born in Lahore, Undivided British India in July 1935. His father's name was Shri P.N.Bhardwaj.

Military career
Air Marshal Ravinder Nath Bhardwaj was commissioned into the Indian Air Force (IAF) on 8 Oct 1955.
After joining the Indian Air Force, he saw action in both the 1965 and 1971 Indo-Pakistan Wars. 

In January 1971, as he served in an operational training squadron, where he instituted measures bringing about improved flying skills and knowledge of the trainees, for which he was awarded the Vayu Sena Medal.

During the 1971 war, he held the rank of Squadron Leader, in No. 20 Squadron IAF, a fighter bomber squadron equipped with Hawker Hunter aircraft and as senior officer of the squadron, led a number of deep penetration missions into Pakistani territory attacking heavily defended targets including Pakistani airfields, oil refineries and in support of ground operations. For bravery and leadership displayed in combat missions, Squadron Leader Ravinder Nath Bhardwaj was awarded the Mahavir Chakra, India's second highest gallantry award.

After the war, he went on to hold senior responsibilities:
 Director, Plans at Air Headquarters
 Air Officer Commanding of 15 Wing
 Deputy Commandant & Chief Instructor of National Defence Academy, Khadakvasla
 Air Officer Commanding-in-Chief at Southern Air Command, Trivandrum 	

He rose to the rank of Air Marshal, before retiring on 31 Jul 1993.

References

Indian Air Force officers
Indian aviators
Pilots of the Indo-Pakistani War of 1965
Pilots of the Indo-Pakistani War of 1971
Indian military personnel of the Indo-Pakistani War of 1971
Recipients of the Param Vishisht Seva Medal
Recipients of the Maha Vir Chakra
Recipients of the Vayu Sena Medal